Janet A. Gourlay (1863–1912) was a Scottish Egyptologist, that is most well known for her excavation of and publication on the Mut Complex in Egypt. Janet was born on 30 January 1863 in Dundee, Scotland, to Henry G. Gourlay and Agnes Christine Burell. Later in life, she briefly studied at University College, London in 1893, with William Matthew Flinders Petrie, the pioneering archaeologist, and Margaret Murray.

Personal life 
Janet would meet her lifelong partner Margaret Benson in 1896 during the second excavation of the Mut Complex. The pair were introduced by Lady Jane Lindsay. In conjunction with their social relationship, they formed a scientific partnership that benefitted the pair and allowed them to continue their work in Egypt. This partnership ensured their ability to complete their work without a man and receive the funding they needed complete said work. Upon completion of their excavations, Margaret’s health began deteriorating, so the two women returned to their respective homes. They kept in close contact via letters. In these, they expressed their devotion, emotions, and happenings to one another. Margaret’s health never made a recovery so plans made by the pair to return to Egypt for more excavations were never continued.

On 3 March 1912, Janet died in Kempshot Park, Basingstoke. She never married.

Professional Endeavors 
Janet and Margaret were the first women to undertake an excavation of this nature and is acknowledged in their preface, which reads “we have to thank M. de Morgan’s liberality for the first permission to excavate given to women in Egypt.”

She joined Margaret Benson in 1896 in the second season of excavation at the Mut Complex in Karnak, Thebes, in Egypt. The pair stayed at the Luxor Hotel for the duration of these digging seasons. Janet and Margaret are credited with this excavation of the Temple of Mut, which they would later publish an account of in 1899. It was published as an incomplete work, so that the information could be available to others and it would not be forgotten as it previously had been, which they explained in the preface. Janet and Margaret’s excavation would go on to span two digging seasons, resulting in three digging seasons total for the Mut Complex. The two women restored and uncovered various pieces of sculptures, heads, figures, and architecture. Notable statuary includes the head of Amun (or Amun-re), the head of Ramesses III, a statue of Ramesses II, the figure of priest Sur, Senenmut, and Bak-en-Khonsu, and various other figures. One of the most well known figures recovered by Janet and Margaret was the head of a figure, commonly referred to as The Benson Head. After identifying the items, the pair made an effort to account for religious representations associated with the pieces.

Janet later worked with Percy E. Newberry in 1900 and 1901. The two would publish a journal describing the excavation of Mentu-Em-Hat.

Publications
 Benson, Margaret and Gourlay, Janet. The Temple of Mut in Asher: An account of the excavation of the temple and of the religious representations and objects found therein, as illustrating the history of Egypt and the main religious ideas of the Egyptians, London, John Murray, 1899

References

External links
 Janet A. Gourlay biography

1863 births
1912 deaths
Scottish Egyptologists
Alumni of University College London
British women archaeologists
British women historians
Scottish LGBT people
LGBT historians